Minerva Mena (September 11, 1930 – December 10, 2004) was a Mexican actress and university professor.

1930 births
2004 deaths
Mexican stage actresses
Mexican television actresses
Actresses from Nuevo León